The Union of Bookbinders and Paper Workers of Germany was a trade union representing workers involved in manufacturing paper and binding books in Germany.

History
A loose national association of bookbinders was formed in 1882 by various local unions, and they formally merged into a single union at a conference in Offenbach am Main on 4 April 1885.  It adopted as its journal the Buchbinder-Zeitung, which had been published since 1880, and in 1904 established a head office in Berlin.

The union played a leading role in establishing the International Federation of Bookbinders and Kindred Trades.  In 1919, it became a founding affiliate of the General German Trade Union Confederation.  Within the federation, it was part of the Graphic Block.  By 1928, the union had 55,128 members.  It was banned by the Nazi government in 1933.  After World War II, bookbinders and paper workers were represented as part of the Printing and Paper Union.

Presidents
1885: Adam Dietrich
1904: Emil Kloth
1919: Eugen Haueisen

References

Bookbinders' trade unions
Trade unions established in 1885
Trade unions disestablished in 1933
Trade unions in Germany